SH3 and multiple ankyrin repeat domains 3 (Shank3), also known as proline-rich synapse-associated protein 2 (ProSAP2), is a protein that in humans is encoded by the SHANK3 gene on chromosome 22.  Additional isoforms have been described for this gene but they have not yet been experimentally verified.

Function 

This gene is a member of the Shank gene family. The gene encodes a protein that contains 5 interaction domains or motifs including the ankyrin repeats domain (ANK), a src 3 domain (SH3), a proline-rich domain, a PDZ domain and a sterile α motif domain (SAM). Shank proteins are multidomain scaffold proteins of the postsynaptic density that connect neurotransmitter receptors, ion channels, and other membrane proteins to the actin cytoskeleton and G-protein-coupled signaling pathways. Shank proteins also play a role in synapse formation and dendritic spine maturation.

Clinical significance 

Mutations in this gene are associated with autism spectrum disorder. This gene is often missing in patients with 22q13.3 deletion syndrome (Phelan-McDermid syndrome), although not in all cases.

Interactions 

SHANK3 has been shown to interact with ARHGEF7.

Mouse models 

Mouse models of SHANK3 include N-terminal knock-outs and a PDZ domain knock-out all of which also show social interaction deficits and variable other phenotypes. Most of these mice are homozygous knock-outs whereas all the human Shank3 mutations have been heterozygous.

In an inducible knockout, restoration of Shank3 expression in adult mice promoted dendritic spine growth and recovered normal grooming behaviour and voluntary social interaction. However, the reduced locomotion, anxiety and rotarod deficits remained. Germline restoration of the gene's expression rescued all measured phenotypes. Experiments on different developmental windows suggested that early intervention was more effective in restoring behavioural traits.

Rat Models 
A rat model of SHANK3 was developed using zinc finger nucleases targeting exon 6 of the ankyrin (ANK) repeat domain. The deletion (-68bp) resulted in reduction of the full length SHANK3a protein. It is unclear if the expression of other isoforms (b and c) of SHANK3 is affected in this rodent model. The shank3 mutant rats have deficits in long-term social recognition memory but not short-term social recognition memory as well as deficits in attention. These mutant also have impaired synaptic plasticity. In humans, 5 patients have been described harboring varying mutations in exon 6 of the SHANK3 protein.

References

Further reading

External links 
  GeneReviews/NCBI/NIH/UW entry on Phelan-McDermid or 22q13.3 deletion syndrome

Genes